The anime series Eyeshield 21 is based on the manga series of the same name written by Riichiro Inagaki and illustrated by Yusuke Murata. The series is directed by Masayoshi Nishida and produced by TV Tokyo, NAS and Gallop The plot of the episodes follows Sena Kobayakawa, a student who becomes an American football player against his desire but eventually becomes the star of the team, wearing an eyeshield to protect his identity.

Episodes 73 between 145 of Eyeshield 21 aired from September 6, 2006 to March 19, 2008 on TV Tokyo. The episodes were later released in eighteen DVD compilations between January 26, 2007 and June 25, 2008 by Bandai Visual.

The series use seven pieces of theme music: three opening and four ending themes. The ending themes "Run to Win" by Aya Hirano, Miyu Irino, Koichi Nagano and Kappei Yamaguchi, used for the first twenty-eight episodes, "A day dreaming..." by Back-On, used between episode 101 and 116, "Flower" by Back-On from episode 117 to 126, and "Song of Power" by Short Leg Summer from episode 127 to 144. Episodes 87 and 145 use "Dang Dang" as the ending theme.

Episode list

References

73-145